Roca Centella is a mountain of Catalonia, Spain. It has an elevation of 1,000 metres above sea level. This mountain is part of the Catalan Pre-Coastal Range.

The name of the mountain means "Lightning Rock" in the Catalan language.

See also
Catalan Pre-Coastal Range
Mountains of Catalonia

References

Mountains of Catalonia